Margarita Pisano Fischer (28 October 1932 - 9 June 2015) was a Chilean architect, writer, theoretician, and feminist  belonging to the Movimiento Rebelde del Afuera (Rebel Movement of the Outside).

Biography 
Margarita Pisano Fischer was born in Punta Arenas, Chile on 28 October 1932.
She was one of the founders of La Casa de la Mujer La Morada, Radio Tierra, and Movimiento Feminista Autónomo. In addition, she was one of the founders of Movimiento Feminista, an opposition group to the Military dictatorship of Augusto Pinochet where the slogan was "Democracy in the country, in the house and in the bed", a phrase promoted by Margarita and Julieta Kirkwood.

As with Francesca Gargallo, the work of Pisano demonstrated the theoretical proposals associated with the field of gender studies but from a feminist perspective away from political analysis and activism. This included one of the main criticisms of "patriarchal feminism", the problems of autonomy and independence of the feminist movement, and the institutionalization of gender advocated by traditional feminism.

Likewise, Pisano was one of the founders of the feminist group "Cómplices" that emerged in 1993, made up of Pisano, Edda Gaviola, Sandra Lidid, Ximena Bedregal, Rosa Rojas, Francesca Gargallo, and Amalia Fischer. They demanded recognition of the different forms of thinking and politics that existed within the feminist movement. Cómplices debuted in 1993 during the Sixth Latin American and Caribbean Feminist Meeting in El Salvador, manifesting itself, as described by Ximena Bedregal, one of the members of the group, as "a political and philosophical proposal in Chile and Mexico (...) in the confluence of different processes, but with the central idea of recognizing that there are different feminisms, explaining the differences, including autonomy, and the construction of a feminist space from autonomy and radicality, as an exercise in the installation of a different speech, the political difference made explicit". Pisano and Bedregal's lesbian feminist writings in 1996-7 were credited with identifying a loss of radical feminism. Pisano died in Santiago, Chile, 9 June 2015.

Selected works 
 Una historia fuera de la historia. Biografía política de Margarita Pisano (2009), en co-autoría Andrea Franulic Depix
 Julia, quiero que seas feliz (2003).
 El triunfo de la masculinidad (2001).
 Feminismos cómplices: gestos para una cultura tendenciosamente diferente (México-Santiago: La Correa Feminista, 1993), en coautoría con Ximena Bedregal, Francesca Gargallo, Amalia Fisher y Edda Gaviola.
 Un cierto desparpajo (Santiago: Eds. Número Crítico, 1996).
 Deseos de cambio, a--el cambio de los deseos? (Santiago: Sandra Lidid., 1995).
 Espiritualidad: una reflexión desde el género (Santiago: La Morada, 1990).
 Feminismo: pasos críticos y deseos de cambio (Santiago: La Morada, 1990).
 Una historia fuera de la historia: biografía política de Margarita Pisano'  (Santiago: Editorial Revolucionarias, 2009
 Julia, quiero que seas feliz (Santiago: Editorial Revolucionarias, 2004, 2012).
 Reflexiones feministas (Santiago: Casa de la Mujer La Morada, 1990).
 El signo de las mujeres en nuestra cultura (Santiago: Casa de la Mujer La Morada, 1990).

References

External links 
 Official website (in Spanish)

1932 births
2015 deaths
Chilean people of German descent
Chilean people of Italian descent
20th-century Chilean women writers
Chilean LGBT writers
Chilean non-fiction writers
People from Punta Arenas
Chilean architects
Women architects
Chilean feminist writers
21st-century Chilean women writers